Duke of Ciudad Real is a hereditary title in the Peerage of Spain accompanied by the dignity of Grandee, granted in 1613 by Philip III to Alonso de Idiázquez, 1st Count of Aramayona and Viceroy of Navarre.

Contrary to common belief, the title makes reference to the municipality of Cittareale in the province of Rieti, and not to the city of Ciudad Real in Spain. The first duke was granted fiefdom over Cittareale in the Kingdom of Naples, hence the translation in Spanish to "Ciudad Real".

Dukes of Ciudad Real (1613)

Alonso de Idiázquez y Butrón, 1st Duke of Ciudad Real
Juan Alonso de Idiázquez y Butrón, 2nd Duke of Ciudad Real
Francisco Alonso de Idiázquez y Álava, 3rd Duke of Ciudad Real
Francisco de Idiázquez y Borja, 4th Duke of Ciudad Real
Juana María de Idiázquez y Borja, 5th Duchess of Ciudad Real
María Antonia Pimentel e Idiázquez, 6th Duchess of Ciudad Real
Ana María de Orozco y Villela, 7th Duchess of Ciudad Real
Joaquín Antonio Osorio y Orozco, 8th Duke of Ciudad Real
Benito Osorio y Lasso de la Vega, 9th Duke of Ciudad Real
Andrés Avelino de Salabert y Arteaga, 10th Duke of Ciudad Real
Casilda de Salabert y Arteaga, 11th Duchess of Ciudad Real
Luis Jesús Fernández de Córdoba y Salabert, 12th Duke of Ciudad Real
Victoria Eugenia Fernández de Córdoba y Fernández de Henestrosa, 13th Duchess of Ciudad Real
Alexander Gonzalo de Hohenlohe-Langenburg y Schmidt-Polex, 14th Duke of Ciudad Real

See also
List of dukes in the peerage of Spain
List of current Grandees of Spain
Marquess of Navahermosa

References

Dukedoms of Spain
Grandees of Spain
Lists of dukes
Lists of Spanish nobility